Filipinos began immigrating to Michigan in 1903, following the adoption of the Pensionado Act. After seeing the success of the program, other Filipinos began to self-fund their own immigration to the United States. The very first immigrants settled in Hawaii, San Francisco, Los Angeles, and Seattle. These early immigrants faced racism and the struggles of the Great Depression, and moved to the Midwestern United States in hopes of finding better employment opportunities. 

1903 establishments in Michigan
Ethnic groups in Michigan
Michigan
Filipino-American history